The 1887 Colonial Conference met in London in 1887 on the occasion of Queen Victoria's Golden Jubilee. It was organised at the behest of the Imperial Federation League in hopes of creating closer ties between the colonies and the United Kingdom. It was attended by more than 100 delegates, mostly unofficial observers, from both self-governing and dependent colonies. India, however, was not represented.

Among other things discussed, the colonies in Australia and New Zealand agreed to pay £126,000 per annum towards the Royal Navy to help pay for the United Kingdom's naval deployments in the Pacific.  In exchange, the British government agreed not to reduce its Pacific Station without colonial consent.

A proposal to lay a telegraph cable between Vancouver and Australia was approved. A Resolution to extend the Queen's title to "Queen of the United Kingdom of Great Britain, Ireland, and the Colonies, and all Dependencies thereof, and Empress of India" was also adopted.

The conference was only a deliberative body and resolutions passed were not binding. While this was the case and the conference itself was not established by law, it was seen as a formal step in the process of consultation concerning imperial policy and legislation.

Participants
The conference was hosted by Queen Victoria, Empress of India and her Prime Minister, Lord Salisbury, with Sir Henry Thurston Holland (Secretary of State for the Colonies) acting as chair and the Premiers and other representatives of various colonies as delegates. The colonies invited to send delegates were Newfoundland Colony, Canada, Colony of New South Wales, Colony of Tasmania, Cape of Good Hope, South Australia, the Colony of New Zealand, Victoria, Queensland, Western Australia, and Natal Colony. Various other colonies were invited to send representatives to the opening ceremonies but not participate as delegates. William A. Baillie-Hamilton, the Private Secretary to the Secretary of State for the Colonies, acted as Secretary to the Conference. The delegates were only able to agree on the most general programs towards closer cooperation.

In his opening address, Lord Salisbury cited the importance of mutual defense but also maintained his opposition to the creation of a federation, deeming it impractical. He explained that attempts at constitution-making is not feasible because such imperial federation could not conduct its affairs from one center. Some colonies also threatened to boycott debates about such measure.

References

Sources

Citations

Hansard 25 March 1887

See also
 Imperial Conference
 All Red Line - the eventual network of telegraph cables connecting the British Empire.

Imperial Conference
1887 in international relations
1887 in the United Kingdom
1887 conferences
1887 in London
1887 in the British Empire
Events in London
April 1887 events
May 1887 events